The model of hierarchical complexity (MHC) is a framework for scoring how complex a behavior is, such as verbal reasoning or other cognitive tasks. It quantifies the order of hierarchical complexity of a task based on mathematical principles of how the information is organized, in terms of information science. This model was developed by Michael Commons and Francis Richards in the early 1980s.

Overview
The model of hierarchical complexity (MHC) is a formal theory and a mathematical psychology framework for scoring how complex a behavior is. Developed by Michael Lamport Commons and colleagues, it quantifies the order of hierarchical complexity of a task based on mathematical principles of how the information is organized, in terms of information science. Its forerunner was the general stage model.

Behaviors that may be scored include those of individual humans or their social groupings (e.g., organizations, governments, societies), animals, or machines. It enables scoring the hierarchical complexity of task accomplishment in any domain. It is based on the very simple notions that higher order task actions:
are defined in terms of the next lower ones (creating hierarchy);
organize the next lower actions;
organize lower actions in a non-arbitrary way (differentiating them from simple chains of behavior).

It is cross-culturally and cross-species valid. The reason it applies cross-culturally is that the scoring is based on the mathematical complexity of the hierarchical organization of information. Scoring does not depend upon the content of the information (e.g., what is done, said, written, or analyzed) but upon how the information is organized.

The MHC is a non-mentalistic model of developmental stages. It specifies 16 orders of hierarchical complexity and their corresponding stages. It is different from previous proposals about developmental stage applied to humans; instead of attributing behavioral changes across a person's age to the development of mental structures or schema, this model posits that task sequences of task behaviors form hierarchies that become increasingly complex. Because less complex tasks must be completed and practiced before more complex tasks can be acquired, this accounts for the developmental changes seen, for example, in individual persons' performance of complex tasks. (For example, a person cannot perform arithmetic until the numeral representations of numbers are learned. A person cannot operationally multiply the sums of numbers until addition is learned. However, as much as natural intelligence helps human to understand some numbers, it does not play a complete role in multiplying large numbers without learning additions. 

The creators of the MHC claim that previous theories of stage have confounded the stimulus and response in assessing stage by simply scoring responses and ignoring the task or stimulus. The MHC separates the task or stimulus from the performance. The participant's performance on a task of a given complexity represents the stage of developmental complexity.

Previous stage theories were unsatisfying to Commons and Richards because the theories did not show the existence of the stages more than describing sequential changes in human behavior. This led them to create a list of two concepts they felt a successful developmental theory should address. The two ideas they wanted to study were (1) the hierarchical complexity of the task to be solved and (2) the psychology, sociology, and anthropology of the task performance (and the development of the performance).

Vertical complexity of tasks performed
One major basis for this developmental theory is task analysis. The study of ideal tasks, including their instantiation in the real world, has been the basis of the branch of stimulus control called psychophysics. Tasks are defined as sequences of contingencies, each presenting stimuli and each requiring a behavior or a sequence of behaviors that must occur in some non-arbitrary fashion. The complexity of behaviors necessary to complete a task can be specified using the horizontal complexity and vertical complexity definitions described below. Behavior is examined with respect to the analytically-known complexity of the task.

Tasks are quantal in nature. They are either completed correctly or not completed at all. There is no intermediate state (tertium non datur). For this reason, the model characterizes all stages as P-hard and functionally distinct. The orders of hierarchical complexity are quantized like the electron atomic orbitals around the nucleus: each task difficulty has an order of hierarchical complexity required to complete it correctly, analogous to the atomic Slater determinant. Since tasks of a given quantified order of hierarchical complexity require actions of a given order of hierarchical complexity to perform them, the stage of the participant's task performance is equivalent to the order of complexity of the successfully completed task. The quantal feature of tasks is thus particularly instrumental in stage assessment because the scores obtained for stages are likewise discrete.

Every task contains a multitude of subtasks. When the subtasks are carried out by the participant in a required order, the task in question is successfully completed. Therefore, the model asserts that all tasks fit in some configured sequence of tasks, making it possible to precisely determine the hierarchical order of task complexity. Tasks vary in complexity in two ways: either as horizontal (involving classical information); or as vertical (involving hierarchical information).

Horizontal complexity
Classical information describes the number of "yes–no" questions it takes to do a task. For example, if one asked a person across the room whether a penny came up heads when they flipped it, their saying "heads" would transmit 1 bit of "horizontal" information. If there were 2 pennies, one would have to ask at least two questions, one about each penny. Hence, each additional 1-bit question would add another bit. Let us say they had a four-faced top with the faces numbered 1, 2, 3, and 4. Instead of spinning it, they tossed it against a backboard as one does with dice in a game of craps. Again, there would be 2 bits. One could ask them whether the face had an even number. If it did, one would then ask if it were a 2. Horizontal complexity, then, is the sum of bits required by just such tasks as these.

Vertical complexity
Hierarchical complexity refers to the number of recursions that the coordinating actions must perform on a set of primary elements. Actions at a higher order of hierarchical complexity: (a) are defined in terms of actions at the next lower order of hierarchical complexity; (b) organize and transform the lower-order actions (see Figure 2); (c) produce organizations of lower-order actions that are qualitatively new and not arbitrary, and cannot be accomplished by those lower-order actions alone. Once these conditions have been met, we say the higher-order action coordinates the actions of the next lower order.

To illustrate how lower actions get organized into more hierarchically complex actions, let us turn to a simple example. Completing the entire operation 3 × (4 + 1) constitutes a task requiring the distributive act. That act non-arbitrarily orders adding and multiplying to coordinate them. The distributive act is therefore one order more hierarchically complex than the acts of adding and multiplying alone; it indicates the singular proper sequence of the simpler actions. Although simply adding results in the same answer, people who can do both display a greater freedom of mental functioning. Additional layers of abstraction can be applied. Thus, the order of complexity of the task is determined through analyzing the demands of each task by breaking it down into its constituent parts.

The hierarchical complexity of a task refers to the number of concatenation operations it contains, that is, the number of recursions that the coordinating actions must perform. An order-three task has three concatenation operations. A task of order three operates on one or more tasks of vertical order two and a task of order two operates on one or more tasks of vertical order one (the simplest tasks).

Stages of development
Stage theories describe human organismic and/or technological evolution as systems that move through a pattern of distinct stages over time. Here development is described formally in terms of the model of hierarchical complexity (MHC).

Formal definition of stage
Since actions are defined inductively, so is the function h, known as the order of the hierarchical complexity. To each action A, we wish to associate a notion of that action's hierarchical complexity, h(A). Given a collection of actions A and a participant S performing A, the stage of performance of S on A is the highest order of the actions in A completed successfully at least once, i.e., it is: stage (S, A) = max{h(A) | A ∈ A and A completed successfully by S}. Thus, the notion of stage is discontinuous, having the same transitional gaps as the orders of hierarchical complexity. This is in accordance with previous definitions.

Because MHC stages are conceptualized in terms of the hierarchical complexity of tasks rather than in terms of mental representations (as in Piaget's stages), the highest stage represents successful performances on the most hierarchically complex tasks rather than intellectual maturity.

Stages of hierarchical complexity
The following table gives descriptions of each stage in the MHC.

Relationship with Piaget's theory
The MHC builds on Piagetian theory but differs from it in many ways; notably the MHC has additional higher stages. In both theories, one finds:
Higher-order actions defined in terms of lower-order actions. This forces the hierarchical nature of the relations and makes the higher-order tasks include the lower ones and requires that lower-order actions are hierarchically contained within the relative definitions of the higher-order tasks.
Higher-order of complexity actions organize those lower-order actions. This makes them more powerful. Lower-order actions are organized by the actions with a higher order of complexity, i.e., the more complex tasks.

What Commons et al. (1998) have added includes:
Higher-order-of-complexity actions organize those lower-order actions in a non-arbitrary way.

This makes it possible for the model's application to meet real world requirements, including the empirical and analytic. Arbitrary organization of lower order of complexity actions, possible in the Piagetian theory, despite the hierarchical definition structure, leaves the functional correlates of the interrelationships of tasks of differential complexity formulations ill-defined.

Moreover, the model is consistent with the neo-Piagetian theories of cognitive development. According to these theories, progression to higher stages or levels of cognitive development is caused by increases in processing efficiency and working memory capacity. That is, higher-order stages place increasingly higher demands on these functions of information processing, so that their order of appearance reflects the information processing possibilities at successive ages.

The following dimensions are inherent in the application:
 Task and performance are separated.
 All tasks have an order of hierarchical complexity.
 There is only one sequence of orders of hierarchical complexity.
 Hence, there is structure of the whole for ideal tasks and actions.
 There are transitional gaps between the orders of hierarchical complexity.
 Stage is defined as the most hierarchically complex task solved.
 There are discrete gaps in Rasch scaled stage of performance.
 Performance stage is different task area to task area.
 There is no structure of the whole—horizontal décalage—for performance. It is not inconsistency in thinking within a developmental stage. Décalage is the normal modal state of affairs.

Orders and corresponding stages
The MHC specifies 16 orders of hierarchical complexity and their corresponding stages, positing that each of Piaget's substages, in fact, are robustly hard stages. The MHC adds five postformal stages to Piaget's developmental trajectory: systematic stage 12, metasystematic stage 13, paradigmatic stage 14, cross-paradigmatic stage 15, and meta-cross-paradigmatic stage 16. It may be the Piaget's consolidate formal stage is the same as the systematic stage. The sequence is as follows: (0) calculatory, (1) automatic, (2) sensory & motor, (3) circular sensory-motor, (4) sensory-motor, (5) nominal, (6) sentential, (7) preoperational, (8) primary, (9) concrete, (10) abstract, (11) formal, and the five postformal: (12) systematic, (13) metasystematic, (14) paradigmatic, (15) cross-paradigmatic, and (16) meta-cross-paradigmatic. The first four stages (0–3) correspond to Piaget's sensorimotor stage at which infants and very young children perform. Adolescents and adults can perform at any of the subsequent stages. MHC stages 4 through 5 correspond to Piaget's pre-operational stage; 6 through 8 correspond to his concrete operational stage; and 9 through 11 correspond to his formal operational stage.

More complex behaviors characterize multiple system models. The four highest stages in the MHC are not represented in Piaget's model. The higher stages of the MHC have extensively influenced the field of positive adult development. Some adults are said to develop alternatives to, and perspectives on, formal operations; they use formal operations within a "higher" system of operations. Some theorists call the more complex orders of cognitive tasks "postformal thought", but other theorists argue that these higher orders cannot exactly be labelled as postformal thought.

Jordan (2018) argued that unidimensional models such as the MHC, which measure level of complexity of some behavior, refer to only one of many aspects of adult development, and that other variables are needed (in addition to unidimensional measures of complexity) for a fuller description of adult development.

Empirical research using the model
The MHC has a broad range of applicability. Its mathematical foundation permits it to be used by anyone examining task performance that is organized into stages. It is designed to assess development based on the order of complexity which the actor utilizes to organize information. The model thus allows for a standard quantitative analysis of developmental complexity in any cultural setting. Other advantages of this model include its avoidance of mentalistic explanations, as well as its use of quantitative principles which are universally applicable in any context.

The following practitioners can use the MHC to quantitatively assess developmental stages:
 Cross-cultural developmentalists
 Animal developmentalists
 Evolutionary psychologists
 Organizational psychologists
 Developmental political psychologists
 Learning theorists
 Perception researchers
 Historians of science
 Educators
 Therapists
 Anthropologists

List of examples
In one representative study, Commons, Goodheart, and Dawson (1997) found, using Rasch analysis (Rasch, 1980), that hierarchical complexity of a given task predicts stage of a performance, the correlation being r = 0.92. Correlations of similar magnitude have been found in a number of the studies. The following are examples of tasks studied using the model of hierarchical complexity or Kurt W. Fischer's similar skill theory:

 Algebra (Commons, Giri, & Harrigan, 2014)
 Animal stages (Commons & Miller, 2004)
 Atheism (Commons-Miller, 2005)
 Attachment and loss (Commons, 1991; Miller & Lee, 2000)
 Balance beam and pendulum (Commons, Goodheart, & Bresette, 1995; Commons, Giri, & Harrigan, 2014)
 Contingencies of reinforcement (Commons & Giri, 2016)
 Counselor stages (Lovell, 2002)
 Empathy of hominids (Commons & Wolfsont, 2002)
 Epistemology (Kitchener & Fischer, 1990; Kitchener & King, 1990)
 Evaluative reasoning (Dawson, 2000)
 Four story problem (Commons, Richards & Kuhn, 1982; Kallio & Helkama, 1991)
 Good education (Dawson-Tunik, 2004)
 Good interpersonal relations (Armon, 1984a; Armon, 1984b; Armon, 1989)
 Good work (Armon, 1993)
 Honesty and kindness (Lamborn, Fischer & Pipp, 1994)
 Informed consent (Commons & Rodriguez, 1990; Commons & Rodriguez, 1993; Commons, Goodheart, Rodriguez, & Gutheil, 2006)
 Language stages (Commons et al., 2007)
 Leadership before and after crises (Oliver, 2004)
 Loevinger's sentence completion task (Cook-Greuter, 1990)
 Moral judgment (Armon & Dawson, 1997; Dawson, 2000)
 Music (Beethoven) (Funk, 1989)
 Physics tasks (Inhelder & Piaget, 1958)
 Political development (Sonnert & Commons, 1994)
 Report patient's prior crimes (Commons, Lee, Gutheil, et al., 1995)
 Social perspective-taking (Commons & Rodriguez, 1990; Commons & Rodriguez, 1993)
 Spirituality (Miller & Cook-Greuter, 1994)
 Tool making of hominids (Commons & Miller 2002)
 Views of the good life (Armon, 1984b; Danaher, 1993; Dawson, 2000; Lam, 1995)
 Workplace culture (Commons, Krause, Fayer, & Meaney, 1993)
 Workplace organization (Bowman, 1996)

As of 2014, people and institutes from all the major continents of the world, except Africa, have used the model of hierarchical complexity. Because the model is very simple and is based on analysis of tasks and not just performances, it is dynamic. With the help of the model, it is possible to quantify the occurrence and progression of transition processes in task performances at any order of hierarchical complexity.

Criticisms
The descriptions of stages 13–15 have been described as insufficiently precise.

See also

References

Literature

 
 
 
 
 
 Biggs, J.B. & Collis, K. (1982). Evaluating the quality of learning: The SOLO taxonomy (structure of the observed learning outcome). New York: Academic Press.
 
 
 
 
 
 
 
 
 
 
 
 
 
 
 
 
 
 
 
 
 
 
 
 
 
 
 
 
 
 
 
 
 Fischer, K.W. (1980). A theory of cognitive development: The control and construction of hierarchies of skills. Psychological Review, 87(6), 477–531.

External links

 Behavioral Development Bulletin
 Society for Research in Adult Development

Cognition
Management cybernetics
Complex systems theory
Developmental stage theories
Psychophysics